Praça da República may refer to:

 Praça da República (São Paulo)
 Praça da República (Póvoa de Varzim)

See also
Republic Square (disambiguation)
Náměstí Republiky (disambiguation)
Plaza de la República (disambiguation)
Piazza della Repubblica (disambiguation)